Hit 106, HIT-106 or Hits 106 can refer to one of the following radio stations:

KARP-FM, licensed to Dassel, Minnesota 
WHTG-FM, licensed to Eatontown
WBBO Bass River Township, New Jersey (simulcast of WHTG-FM)
WHYB, licensed to Menominee, Michigan, formerly branded as "Hits 106"
WIOG, licensed to Bay City, Michigan